The College National Finals Rodeo (CNFR), sanctioned by the National Intercollegiate Rodeo Association (NIRA), is held every June. Since 1999, the CNFR has been held at the Ford Wyoming Center in Casper, Wyoming. Both men and women rodeo athletes compete for the honor of becoming national champions in their events. Colleges also compete as teams for the chance of winning the men’s and women’s national college rodeo championship. 

There was no CNFR in 2020 because of the COVID-19 pandemic.

External links 
 CNFR Official Website
 NIRA Official Website

College sports championships in the United States
Rodeos